FC DSK Gomel was a Belarusian football club based in Gomel. DSK stands for Домостоительный комбинат (Domostroitel'ny Kombinat, English: House-building Combine).

History
The team was founded in 2008 and won the Second League the same year. In 2009 they debuted in Belarusian First League. In 2010 DSK reached semifinals of Belarusian Cup. The club was dissolved before 2013 season due to financial troubles.

In early 2016 the club had an intention to rejoin the Second League for the upcoming season, but ultimately withdrew its application.

References

External links
Profile at footballfacts

Defunct football clubs in Belarus
2008 establishments in Belarus
2013 disestablishments in Belarus
Association football clubs established in 2008
Association football clubs disestablished in 2013